In algebraic geometry, a regular scheme is a locally Noetherian scheme whose local rings are regular everywhere. Every smooth scheme is regular, and every regular scheme of finite type over a perfect field is smooth.

For an example of a regular scheme that is not smooth, see Geometrically regular ring#Examples.

See also 
Étale morphism
Dimension of an algebraic variety
Glossary of scheme theory
Smooth completion

References

Algebraic geometry
Scheme theory